Yangjaecheon is a stream that flows through the city of Seoul, South Korea. It runs through Gangnam, which is part of the southern half of the city. Yangjaecheon is a greenway stretching five and a half kilometres from Gwanaksan in Gyeonggi through the Seocho, Gangnam, and Songpa districts until it feeds into the Tancheon.

The stream is recessed, with major and minor roads above it on bridges and multiple parallel bike and pedestrian trails flanking it on tiered ledges. Public exercise equipment is provided along the stream, as well as benches and a variety of flowers. 3.75km of the stream was appointed as Seoul Future heritage.

Course
The stream flows from Gyeonggi Province into Seoul through different districts. It has a total length of 15.6km. Its course is shown below:

 Gwacheon; 8.4km
 Seoul
 Seocho District ; 3.7km
 Yangjae-dong
 Gangnam District ; 3.5km
 Dogok-dong
 Daechi 3-dong
 Irwon 2-dong
 Songpa District
 Jamsil-dong
 Tancheon

Ecosystem
There are 174 species of plants, 42 species of birds, 20 species of fish, six species of mammals, and six species of amphibians and reptiles in the Yangjaecheon. The Yangjaecheon Ecological Park, aiming to restore the ecosystem, revived the river's natural state by restoring the riverside slope to create a resting and walking space. Concrete revetments were replaced and reconstructed using megaliths, trees, grasses and natural materials. The vegetation revetments act as safeguards against floods and control the water temperature by creating shade. The Yangjaecheon also provides fish and algae habitats to help maintain the food chain of aquatic ecosystems. It also precipitates and absorbs water and pollutants, easing eutrophication.

Tales related to Yangjaecheon
Yangjaecheon has a tale related to the Guryongsan mountain. The Guryongsan has nine valleys, nine peaks, and nine wells. The name Guryong comes from 'nine dragons'. The highest peak of the Guryongsan is named Guksoobong, which means 'a mountain peak that protects the country'. According to the tale, the mountain originally had ten valleys, with each dragon in one valley. They had to ascend to the sky, but one was late and was seen by a person, so it was unable to ascend. By the rules of good conduct, he had to be a stream for people to drink and farm. The stream made people wealthier and happier, which was why this stream was later named Yangjaecheon.  is a word written in Chinese characters, which is translated as 'a group of talented people.'

Yangjaecheon's development
The Yangjaecheon was originally the first tributary of the Han River. However, it was an artificially created river, so it began to flow into the Tancheon watershed. In the 1970s, the land consolidation project in the Gaepo-dong area intensely polluted Yangjaecheon. After that, pollution became much worse with the rapid increase in population. In order to improve the ecological environment of Yangjaecheon, a natural river system was used for the first time in urban river. From 1995 to 2000, organizations restored water quality to more than 2 grade by removing concrete from both shores for and constructing a vegetation shore, water purification facility, bicycle road and eco-experience center. As a result of these efforts, the Yangjaecheon was selected by the Ministry of Environment in 2005 as an excellent ecological restoration river.

Geographical location of Yangjaecheon 
The Yangjaecheon starts from the Gwanaksan mountain in Gwacheon. It flows through Gwacheon street and joins with the Makgyecheon, and in Seocho, it joins with the Yeouicheon. The Makgyecheon and Yeouicheon are small streams that start from Cheonggyesan. Finally, it flows through Gangnam District and runs into the Tancheon. The total length of Yangjaecheon is 15.6 km. Gwacheon manages 8.4 km, Seocho District manages 3.7 km, and Gangnam District manages 3.5 km. The width of the Yangjaecheon varies from 6-13 m.

Facilities

Bridges 
Gwanak Bridge; 
Gwanmun Bridge; 
Byeoryang Bridge; 
Burim Bridge 1; 
Burim Bridge 2; 
Gwacheon Bridge; 
Yangjaecheon Bridge; 
Juam Bridge; 
Umyeon Bridge; 
Yeongdong Bridge 1; 
Yeongdong Bridge 2; 
Yeongdong Bridge 3; 
Yeongdong Bridge 4; 
Yeongdong Bridge 5; 
Yeongdong Bridge 6; 
Daechi Bridge;

Wetlands 
Rice farming field: open to urban students and citizens. During the agricultural off-season, it is used as an ice sledding field. 
Two swimming pools: one is located near Yeongdong Bridge 3, and the other is located between Yeongdong bridges 4 and 5, near Dogok station.
Water purification facility: located between Yeongdong bridges 2 and 3. It uses gravel contact oxidation to maintain the BOD 1~3 ppm. It can purify 32,000 m3 of water per day.

See also
Rivers of Korea

References

External links
Description from a Korean Tourism website
Visit Seochogoo
Seoul future heritage-Yangjaecheon

Geography of Seoul
Rivers of South Korea